The Romancing Star III is a 1989 Hong Kong romantic comedy film directed by Sherman Wong and starring Stanley Fung, Wong Jing, Lawrence Cheng, James Wong, Shing Fui-On, Sam Christopher Chan and guest stars Andy Lau, the star of The Romancing Star II

Plot
Chow Si-pak (Shing Fui-On), Dried Pork (Wong Jing), Lo Ka-ying (Lawrence Cheng and Yo (Sam Christopher Chan) are cousins who are unemployed. Later, they get jobs at Ken Lau's (Stanley Fung) car garage. Lau's rival, Bluffer Wong (James Wong), has a competing business that employs young girls as the mechanics. The girls are spectacularly attractive, and include Wong's sister in-law, Man, (Sharla Cheung) and his three daughters Ching (Chingmy Yau), Man-man (Vivian Chow and Tak (Wanda Yung), meaning the boys are primed to chase them all over Hong Kong. But they lack the skills to woo the ladies, so they call the Love Doctor, Ken's nephew Lau Pei (Andy Lau), who teaches them the unbeatable "13 Ways to Seduce a Woman".

Cast
Stanley Fung as Ken Lau Ting-kin
Wong Jing as Dried Pork
Lawrence Cheng as Lo Ka Ying
James Wong as Bluffer Wong
Shing Fui-On as Chow Si-pak
Sam Christopher Chan as Yo
Andy Lau as Lau Pei (guest star)
Sharla Cheung as Auntie Man
Chingmy Yau as Ching
Vivian Chow as Man-man
Wanda Yung as Tak
Chow Yun-fat as Mechanic in flashback (uncredited cameo;archive footage)
Felix Lok as Mr. Kwan
Sandra Ng as Cocktail waitress at disco
Yiu Yau-hung as Yiu Siu-hung
Jo Jo Ngan as Mr. Kwan's dancing partner
Hung Law-fat
Philip Chan
Yu Mo-lin as Miss Oyster
Jameson Law as Theatre patron scolded by Pak
Dennis Chan as Theatre manager
Frankie Chan as Gay patron in restaurant in Vancouver
Fung King-man as Darkie Fung
Chow Kong as Darkie Fung's man
Cheung Kwok-wah as Darkie Fung's man
Shing Fuk-on as Mr. Kwan's bodyguard
Chan Wai-yue as Dance contest judge
Seung Koon-yuk as Beauty parlour manager
Michelle Sze-ma as Greedy Miss Oyster
Yat-poon Chai as Police Sergeant
Bonnie Fu as Chinese opera actress
Ling Hon as Chinese opera boss
Charlie Cho as Chinese opera actor
Ng Kwok-kin as Police Officer
Fei Pak as policeman

Box office
The film grossed HK$10,399,779 at the Hong Kong box office during its theatrical run from 21 December 1989 to 23 January 1990 in Hong Kong.

See also
Andy Lau filmography
Wong Jing filmography

External links

The Romancing Star III at Hong Kong Cinemagic

1989 films
1989 romantic comedy films
Hong Kong romantic comedy films
Hong Kong slapstick comedy films
Hong Kong sequel films
1980s Cantonese-language films
Films set in Hong Kong
Films shot in Hong Kong
1980s Hong Kong films